Arem may refer to:
Arem people
The Arem language
Arem, the final boss from Ys IV: The Dawn of Ys
Arem-arem, a Javanese snack.
Arem, Joel who was listed on the Bibliography of encyclopedias
Don van Arem, a World Championships medalist in sailing.
Jocelyn Arem from the 58th Annual Grammy Awards